Fusuisaurus (meaning "Fusui lizard" from the name of the county where it was discovered) is a genus of sauropod dinosaur from the Early Cretaceous of China.
Fragmentary postcranial remains of this animal have been discovered in 2001 in the Napai Formation of Guangxi, China and consist of the left ilium, left pubis, anterior caudals, most of the dorsal ribs and distal end of the left femur. This sauropod has been described as a basal titanosauriform.

The type species is F. zhaoi, named in honour of Chinese paleontologist Zhao Xijin.

Size 
In 2016 Gregory S. Paul gave a length of 22 meters (72 ft) and a weight of 35 tonnes (38.6 short tons). This sauropod was very large animal, as its humerus was 183.5 cm long. Despite this, the weight of this sauropod is estimated "only" at about 35 000 kilograms.

References

Sources 

 

Early Cretaceous dinosaurs of Asia
Titanosaurs
Cretaceous China
Paleontology in Guangxi